Norwich Township, Ohio may refer to:
Norwich Township, Franklin County, Ohio
Norwich Township, Huron County, Ohio

Ohio township disambiguation pages